Jamie Moriarty (born March 26, 1981) is an American bobsledder who has competed since 2006. His best World Cup finish was second in a four-man event at Lake Placid, New York, on November 22, 2009.

Biography
Moriarty graduated in 2003 from Cornell University with a degree in hotel and restaurant management. He played safety on the Cornell Big Red football team where he had 152 tackles and six interceptions over three seasons.

Moriarty made the US team in the four-man event for the 2010 Winter Olympics, where he finished 13th (with Bill Schuffenhauer, Nick Cunningham and Mike Kohn).

He co-founded the Uber Dispensing Company which produces the UberTap, a hands-free three-sprout keg tap.

Family
Moriarty has four family members who played in the National Football League: his father, Tom;  his uncle, Pat; his uncle Frank; and his uncle Larry.

References

http://www.licensingoutlook.com/archive/u/uber_8-30-06.html

https://nhl.nbcsports.com/2011/05/17/sharks-douglas-murray-not-just-a-bruising-defender-also-beer-genius/

http://www.chicagonow.com/blogs/sarah-spain/2010/02/a-spanish-inquisition-winnetka-resident-cornell-grad-olympic-bobsledder-jamie-moriarty.html

External links
 
 
 
 
 
 NYT Article about football players in bobsledding
 Article about Cornell athletes in the 2010 Winter Olympics

1981 births
American male bobsledders
Bobsledders at the 2010 Winter Olympics
Cornell University alumni
Living people
Olympic bobsledders of the United States